Effective mass may refer to:
Effective mass (solid-state physics), a property of an excitation in a crystal analogous to the mass of a free particle
Effective mass (spring–mass system)

See also
Reduced mass, used to simplify a two-body problem in terms of a one-body problem